The word  refers to a type of sexual fetish in hentai wherein a protagonist, usually female, is subject to physical or psychological abuse from an offender who is usually male. The term is mostly used in connection to Japanese culture, although the theme itself is seen in many other cultures.

The term ryona almost exclusively refers to the action of a woman being abused by a man. In a case where the target is male, it is more commonly called . The genre focuses exclusively on fictional characters in these situations. In some cases, the perpetrator could be a monster or other non-human being.

The term is contrasted with sexual sadism and rape pornography, in that ryona is a voyeuristic fantasy fetish, a romanticized subgenre aimed at a female target demographic and are almost always of non-explicit sexual nature.

Description
Works in the ryona genre usually depict two characters meeting and developing a relationship with each other, which may begin in or devolve into a state of hostility.

Examples
The nature of abuse can vary greatly, but it usually includes one or more of the following:

 Domestic violence and rape, and depictions thereof
 Inconvenient disruption of everyday life, such as being prevented attending one's job, or being embarrassed or rejected by friends and family
 Forced confinement and detention for extended periods of time
 Literal torture for extortion, confession, or simply for sexual gratification of the torturer.
 Being regarded and treated as property of another person

References

Bibliography
 

Anime and manga genres
Anime and manga terminology
Fetish subculture
Hentai
Hentai anime and manga
Japanese pornography
Japanese sex terms
Pornography by genre
Rape in fiction
Sexuality in Japan
Violence against men
Violence against women
Works about violence against women